Eublemma is a genus of moths of the family Erebidae described by Jacob Hübner in 1829.

Taxonomy
The genus has previously been classified in the subfamily Eublemminae within Erebidae or in the subfamily Eustrotiinae of the family Noctuidae.

Description
Its palpi are upturned and reach just above the vertex of the head, and have a short third joint. The antennae are minutely ciliated in the male. Thorax and abdomen smoothly scaled. Legs short, tibia moderately hairy. Forewings with somewhat produced and depressed apex. Veins 6 and 7 from angle of cell and veins 8 to 10 stalked from before angle. Hindwings with veins 3,4 and 6,7 from angles of cell. Larva with two pairs of abdominal prolegs.

Species
In alphabetical order:
Eublemma acarodes Swinhoe, 1907
Eublemma accedens (Felder & Rogenhofer, 1874) Burkina Faso, Gambia, Ghana, Nigeria, Saudi Arabia, Ethiopia, Kenya, Tanzania, Malawi, Zaire, Magagascar, Indo-Australian Tropics, Australia, New Caledonia, Fiji
Eublemma acuta Candéze, 1927 Cambodia
Eublemma acutiangulatalis (Rothschild, 1915) New Guinea
Eublemma aethiopiana Hacker, 2019 Ethiopia
Eublemma afghana (Wiltshire, 1961) Afghanistan
Eublemma aftob (Brandt, 1938) Iran
Eublemma agnella (Brandt, 1938) Iran
Eublemma agrapta Hampson, 1898 Sri Lanka
Eublemma albicans Guenée, 1852
Eublemma albicosta Hampson, 1910 Gambia, Liberia, Sierra Leone, Burkina Faso, Ghana, Gabon
Eublemma albida (Duponchel, 1843) southern Spain, Morocco, Algeria, Libya, Mauritania, Gambia
Eublemma albifascia Hampson, 1910 Burkina Faso, Ivory Coast, Ghana, Nigeria, Cameroon, Tanzania
Eublemma albipennis Hampson, 1910 India (Maharashtra)
Eublemma albipurpurea (Warren, 1913) New Guinea
Eublemma albivena (Hampson, 1905) Ethiopia, Kenya, Zaire, Uganda, Malawi, Tanzania, South Africa
Eublemma albivestalis Hampson, 1910
Eublemma albivia Hampson, 1914 Ghana, Nigeria, Ethiopia, Malawi, Tanzania
Eublemma alboseriata Hacker, 2019 Nigeria
Eublemma albostriata Wileman & West, 1929 Philippines
Eublemma alexi Fibiger & Hacker, 2002 Togo, Burkina Faso, Nigeria, Saudi Arabia, Sudan, Ethiopia, Malawi, Tanzania, Zimbabwe, Namibia, South Africa
Eublemma aliena (Krüger, 1939) Libya
Eublemma almaviva Berio, 1947
Eublemma amabilis Moore, [1884] Sri Lanka
Eublemma amasina (Eversmann, 1842) southern Urals, south-eastern Siberia, Japan
Eublemma amoena (Hübner, [1803]) northern Africa, southern Europe, Turkey, Transcaucasia, Caucasus
Eublemma amphidasys Turner, 1933 Australia (Queensland)
Eublemma amydrosana Rebel, 1947 Egypt
Eublemma anachoresis Wallengren, 1863
Eublemma angulata (Butler, 1882) New Britain
Eublemma angustizona Hacker, 2019 South Africa
Eublemma antemediana (Hacker, 2011) Yemen
Eublemma antoninae Nagaraja & Nagarkatti, 1970 southern India
Eublemma apicata Distant, 1898 South Africa, Zimbabwe, Malawi, Tanzania, Kenya
Eublemma apicimacula (Mabille, 1880) Mauritania, Senegal, Gambia, Togo, Ivory Coast, Ghana, Nigeria, Burkina Faso, Cameroon, Gabon, Djibouti, Ethiopia, Uganda, Kenya, Tanzania, Mozambique, Madagascar, Zambia, Zimbabwe, South Africa, Yemen
Eublemma apicipunctalis Brandt, 1939
Eublemma apicipunctum Saalmüller, 1891
Eublemma archaechroma Hacker, 2019 Namibia
Eublemma arenostrota Hampson, 1916 Somalia
Eublemma argentifera (Hampson, 1926) Sierra Leone, southern Nigeria, Cameroon, Gabon, Uganda
Eublemma argyromorpha Hacker & Saldaitis, 2011 Sokotra
Eublemma atrifusa Hampson, 1910 Ghana, Nigeria
Eublemma atrimedia Hampson, 1914
Eublemma aurantiaca Hampson, 1910 Sierra Leone, Burkina Faso, Ghana, Ivory Coast, Nigeria, Gabon, Ethiopia, Kenya, Uganda, Malawi, Zambia, Zimbabwe, South Africa, Madagascar
Eublemma aureola Fibiger & Hacker, 2002 Turkey
Eublemma baccalix (Swinhoe, 1886) India (Madhya Pradesh), Sri Lanka
Eublemma baccatrix Hacker, 2019 Canary Islands, Mauritania, Burkina Faso, Nigeria, Togo, Gambia, Zaire, Arabia, Ethiopia, Kenya, Uganda, Malawi, Angola, Tanzania, Mozambique, Namibia, Eswatini, Zambia, Zimbabwe, South Africa, Madagascar, Mauritius
Eublemma bacchusi Holloway, 2009 Borneo
Eublemma barito Holloway, 2009 Peninsular Malaysia, Sumatra, Borneo
Eublemma barlowi Holloway, 2009 Peninsular Malaysia, Singapore, Borneo
Eublemma basalis (Möschler, 1890) Puerto Rico
Eublemma basiplaga Bethune-Baker, 1911 Angola
Eublemma batanga Draudt, 1950
Eublemma betarosea Holloway, 2009 Borneo
Eublemma bicolora Bethune-Baker, 1911
Eublemma bifasciata (Moore, 1881) India (Uttar Pradesh), Arabia, Sudan, Ethiopia, Kenya, Niger, South Africa
Eublemma bilineata Hampson, 1902 India (Himachal Pradesh)
Eublemma bipars Gaede, 1935 Niger
Eublemma bipartita Hampson, 1902 South Africa, Namibia, Zimbabwe
Eublemma biparva Fibiger & Hacker, 2002 Saudi Arabia, Ethiopia
Eublemma bistellata (Wiltshire, 1961) Arabia
Eublemma blanca Fibiger & Legrain, 2009 Saudi Arabia
Eublemma bolinia (Hampson, 1902) Arabia, Ethiopia, Kenya, Malawi, Tanzania, Mozambique, Botswana, Zimbabwe, Namibia, South Africa, Madagascar
Eublemma bosara Holloway, 2009 Borneo, Peninsular Malaysia
Eublemma boursini (Bytinski-Salz & Brandt, 1937) Iran
Eublemma brachyptera Hacker, 2019 South Africa
Eublemma brachystegiae Hacker, 2019 Malawi
Eublemma brigitta Fiebig, 2019 Uganda
Eublemma brunneifusa Gaede, 1935 Cameroon
Eublemma brunneosa Bethune-Baker, 1911 Kenya
Eublemma brygooi Viette, 1966
Eublemma buettikeri Wiltshire, 1980 Arabia
Eublemma bulla (Swinhoe, [1885]) Arabia, Sudan, Pakistan, India (Maharashtra)
Eublemma caduca (Christoph, 1893)
Eublemma caelestis (Brandt, 1938) Iran
Eublemma caffrorum (Wallengren, 1860) South Africa, Namibia, Zimbabwe, Botswana, Mozambique
Eublemma candicans (Rambur, 1858) southern Spain, Morocco, Algeria
Eublemma candidana (Fabricius, 1794) southern Europe, Turkey, Middle East, Caucasus, Transcaucasus
Eublemma caniceps Rebel, 1917 Sudan
Eublemma canomarmorea Hacker, Fiebig & Stadie, 2019 South Africa
Eublemma caprearum Draudt, 1933 Capri
Eublemma caretifera Holloway, 2009 Borneo
Eublemma carneola Hampson, 1910 Peninsular Malaysia, Borneo
Eublemma carneotincta Hampson, 1910 Guinea, Sierra Leone, Ivory Coast
Eublemma carterotata Dyar, 1919 Costa Rica
Eublemma ceresensis Hacker, 2019 Madagascar, South Africa, Namibia, Eswatini, Zimbabwe, Zaire
Eublemma chamila Draudt, 1936 eastern Turkestan
Eublemma chionophlebia Hampson, 1910 South Africa
Eublemma chlorochroa Hampson, 1910 Ethiopia, Kenya, Tanzania
Eublemma chlorotica (Lederer, 1858) Lebanon
Eublemma chopardi Berio, 1954
Eublemma chrysoleuca Hacker, 2019 South Africa
Eublemma cinnamomea Herrich-Schäffer, 1868
Eublemma cirrochroa Hacker, 2019 Tanzania
Eublemma cochylioides (Guenée, 1852) south-western Europe, Sicily, Crete, Lebanon, Africa, Middle East, southern Asia, Indonesia, Micronesia, Australia, New Holland
Eublemma colla Schaus, 1893
Eublemma collacteana Hacker, 2019 Togo, Ivory Coast, Nigeria, Zaire, Ethiopia, Kenya, Tanzania
Eublemma comutus Fibiger & Hacker, 2004 Yemen
Eublemma confusa Rothschild, 1920 Algeria
Eublemma conistrota Hampson, 1910 Pakistan, Afghanistan, Iran, Oman, Somalia
Eublemma conspersa (Butler, 1880) India (Madhya Pradesh, Himachal Pradesh), Taiwan
Eublemma convergens (Walker, 1869) Zaire
Eublemma costivinata Berio, 1945 Ethiopia
Eublemma cremorna Hampson, 1918
Eublemma cyrenaea (Turati, 1924) Libya, Israel, Jordan, Yemen, Sinai
Eublemma daphoena Hampson, 1910 South Africa
Eublemma daphoenoides Berio, 1941 Somalia, Madagascar
Eublemma debilis (Christoph, 1884) Crimea, Caucasus, southern European Russia, north-eastern Iran
Eublemma debivar Berio, 1947
Eublemma deleta (Staudinger, 1901) Malta, Algeria, Libya, Tunisia, Niger, Egypt, Arabia, Middle East
Eublemma delicata (Felder & Rogenhofer, 1874) Ethiopia, Kenya, Tanzania, Botswana, Zimbabwe, South Africa, Namibia
Eublemma deliciosa (Möschler, 1880) Suriname
Eublemma dentilinea (Hampson, 1926) Uganda, Nigeria, Burkina Faso
Eublemma deserta (Staudinger, 1900) Algeria, Tunisia, Libya, Malta, Arabia, Sudan, Djibouti
Eublemma deserti Rothschild, 1909
Eublemma dhofarica Hacker & Stadie, 2016 Oman, Yemen
Eublemma dichroma Rebel, 1907 Sokotra
Eublemma dimidialis (Fabricius, 1794) Indo-Australian tropics, New Guinea, Australia, Japan
Eublemma dinawa Bethune-Baker, 1906
Eublemma diredaoua Hacker, 2019 Ethiopia
Eublemma dissecta (Saalmüller, 1891) Madagascar
Eublemma dissoluta Rothschild, 1921 Niger
Eublemma draudti (Bytinski-Salz & Brandt, 1937) Iran
Eublemma dyscapna S. A. Fletcher, 1961 Uganda
Eublemma eberti Hacker, 2019 Namibia
Eublemma eburnea (Turati, 1927) Libya
Eublemma ecthaemata Hampson, 1896 Mauritania, Gambia, Arabia, Sudan, northern Egypt, Ethiopia, Kenya, Tanzania, Namibia, Zimbabwe, South Africa
Eublemma ecuadorensis (Hampson, 1918) Ecuador
Eublemma ellipsifera Holloway, 2009 Borneo, Peninsular Malaysia
Eublemma elychrysi (Rambur, 1833) Sardinia, Corsica
Eublemma emir (Culot, 1915) Algeria
Eublemma ephimera Hampson, 1910
Eublemma epistrota Hampson, 1910 India (Himachal Pradesh)
Eublemma eremochroa Hampson, 1916 Somalia
Eublemma ernesti Rothschild, 1915
Eublemma eupethecica Hampson, 1910
Eublemma exanimis Hampson, 1918 Malawi
Eublemma exigua (Walker, [1858]) India (Maharasthra), Cape Verde, Sierra Leone, Ghana, Burkina Faso, Nigeria, Zaire, Malawi, Uganda, Yemen, Ethiopia, Somalia, Kenya, Tanzania, Mozambique, Eswatini, Zimbabwe, South Africa, Angola, Madagascar, Comoros
Eublemma faircloughi Holloway, 2009 Borneo
Eublemma faroulti Rothschild, 1911
Eublemma fasciola (Saalmüller, 1891) Madagascar
Eublemma ferrufascia Hacker, 2019 Kenya, Ethiopia
Eublemma ferruginata Hacker, 2019 Sierra Leone, Ivory Coast, Gabon, Nigeria, Ethiopia, Malawi, Tanzania
Eublemma fiebigii Hacker & Stadie, 2019 South Africa
Eublemma flavens Hacker, 2019 South Africa, Namibia, Eswatini, Tanzania, Ethiopia
Eublemma flavescens Hampson, 1918 Ghana, Kenya, Malawi, Tanzania, Zimbabwe, Namibia, South Africa
Eublemma flavia Hampson, 1910 Panama
Eublemma flavibasis Hampson, 1918
Eublemma flaviceps Hampson, 1902 South Africa, Zimbabwe, Arabia
Eublemma flaviciliata Hampson, 1910
Eublemma flavicosta Hampson, 1910 South Africa, Tanzania, Nigeria, Ghana, Ivory Coast
Eublemma flavicostata (Holland, 1894) Gabon, Zaire, Ghana, Ivory Coast
Eublemma flavida Hampson, 1902 South Africa, Namibia, Botswana,Eswatini
Eublemma flavigilva Hacker, 2019 Namibia
Eublemma flavinia Hampson, 1902
Eublemma flavistriata Hampson, 1910 Ethiopia, Kenya, Uganda, Zaire, Ghana
Eublemma flavitermina Hampson, 1910 South Africa
Eublemma foedosa (Guenée, 1852) Kenya, Uganda, Zambia, Zimbabwe, South Africa
Eublemma fredi Fibiger & Hacker, 2002 Saudi Arabia, Iran
Eublemma fugitiva (Christoph, 1877) northern Iran
Eublemma fulvitermina Hampson, 1910
Eublemma galacteoides Berio, 1937 Somalia
Eublemma gayneri (Rothschild, 1901) Iran, Jordan, Arabia, Egypt, Sudan, Ethiopia, Kenya, Tanzania, Libya, Algeria, Mauritania, Senegal, Burkina Faso, Gambia, Tanzania, Zimbabwe, Namibia, South Africa, Madagascar, India
Eublemma geometriana Viette, 1981
Eublemma gerti Fibiger & Hacker, 2002 Saudi Arabia, Ethiopia
Eublemma geyri Rothschild, 1915 Algeria
Eublemma glaucizona Hampson, 1908 South Africa
Eublemma glaucochroa Turner, 1902 Australia, New Caledonia
Eublemma globus Fibiger & Hacker, 2002 Yemen
Eublemma goateri Fibiger & Hacker, 2004 Yemen
Eublemma gondwana Hacker, 2019 Namibia
Eublemma goniogramma Hampson, 1910 South Africa, Namibia
Eublemma gratiosa (Eversmann, 1854) southern Urals?
Eublemma gratissima (Staudinger, [1892]) western Kazakhstan, Turkey, Caucaus, Transcaucasia, Middle East, Iraq, Iran
Eublemma griseofimbriata Gaede, 1935 South Africa, Namibia
Eublemma guiera Bradley, 1969 Gambia, Senegal, Ivory Coast, Burkina Faso, Nigeria
Eublemma hansa (Herrich-Schäffer, [1851]) southern Urals, Turkey, Caucasus, Transcaucasia, Iran
Eublemma hemichiasma Hacker, 2019 South Africa, Namibia, Ethiopia
Eublemma hemichiona Hampson, 1918 Malawi, Tanzania
Eublemma heterogramma (Mabille, 1881) Angola
Eublemma heteropaura Hacker, 2019 Ethiopia, Tanzania
Eublemma himmighoffeni (Millière, 1867) Spain, southern France, Corsica, Croatia, Greece, southern Iran, South Africa
Eublemma hypozonata Hampson, 1910 Kenya
Eublemma ignefusa Hampson, 1910 Singapore, Peninsular Malaysia, Sumatra, Borneo
Eublemma illimitata (Warren, 1914) South Africa, Ethiopia
Eublemma illota Christoph, 1887
Eublemma inconspicua Walker, 1865
Eublemma indistincta Fibiger & Hacker, 2002 Yemen
Eublemma innocens (Butler, 1886) Australia
Eublemma innotabilis Hacker, 2019 Yemen
Eublemma insignifica Rothschild, 1924 Madagascar
Eublemma intricata (Walker, 1869) Zaire
Eublemma ionoplagiata Hacker & Saldaitis, 2011 Sokotra
Eublemma iophaenna Turner, 1920 Australia (Queensland)
Eublemma irresoluta Dyar, 1919
Eublemma isocroca Hacker, 2019 Tanzania, Ethiopia
Eublemma jocularis (Christoph, 1877) northern Iran
Eublemma joergmuelleri Hacker & Schreier, 2019 Ethiopia
Eublemma juergenschmidli Hacker, 2019 Namibia
Eublemma kettlewelli Wiltshire, 1988 Botswana, Namibia, South Africa
Eublemma keyserlingi Bienert, 1869
Eublemma khalifa (Wiltshire, 1961) Arabia
Eublemma khonoides Wiltshire, 1980 Arabia, Ethiopia
Eublemma kruegeri (Wiltshire, 1970) Sudan, Libya, Israel, Jordan, Palestine
Eublemma kuelekana Staudinger, 1871
Eublemma lacteicosta Hampson, 1910 Nigeria, Ivory Coast
Eublemma lacteola Rothschild, 1914
Eublemma latericolor Turner, 1945
Eublemma lativalva Hacker, 2019 South Africa, Namibia
Eublemma legraini Hacker, 2019 South Africa, Namibia, Zambia, Malawi
Eublemma lentirosea Hampson, 1910
Eublemma leptinia Mabille, 1900
Eublemma leucanides (Staudinger, 1889) Issyk-kul
Eublemma leucanitis Hampson, 1910 South Africa
Eublemma leucodesma (Lower, 1899) Australia (Queensland)
Eublemma leucodicranon Grünberg, 1910 Namibia
Eublemma leucomelana Hampson, 1902
Eublemma leuconeura Hampson, 1910 South Africa, Namibia
Eublemma leucopolia Hacker, 2019 Namibia
Eublemma leucota Hampson, 1910 Saudi Arabia, Iran, Israel, Jordan, Afghanistan
Eublemma leucozona Hampson, 1910 Eritrea, Ethiopia, Kenya, Tanzania
Eublemma lithina (Warren, 1913) Halmaheira
Eublemma loxographa Hacker & Saldaitis, 2016 Sokotra
Eublemma lozostropha Turner, 1902 Australia (Queensland)
Eublemma lucanitis Hampson, 1910 South Africa
Eublemma lutosa (Staudinger, [1892]) Syria, Turkey
Eublemma macrocroca Hacker, 2019 Sierra Leone, Gambia, Ivory Coast, Nigeria, Burkina Faso, Gabon
Eublemma macrotephra Hacker, 2019 Ivory Coast, Nigeria, Cameroon
Eublemma madaphaea Hacker, 2019 Madagascar
Eublemma manakhana Hacker & Schreier, 2019 Yemen
Eublemma maraschensis Osthelder, 1933
Eublemma marginula (Herrich-Schäffer, [1851])
Eublemma marmaropa Meyrick, 1902 Australia (Queensland), New Guinea
Eublemma marmorata Wileman & West, 1929 Philippines, Borneo
Eublemma martini Holloway, 2009 Borneo, Peninsular Malaysia
Eublemma mauritanica Hacker, 2019 Mauritania, Burkina Faso
Eublemma maurochroa Hacker, 2019 Gabon
Eublemma maurocroca Hacker, 2019 Nigeria
Eublemma maxima Fibiger & Hacker, 2002 Yemen
Eublemma mediana Fibiger & Hacker, 2004 Yemen
Eublemma mediovittata Hacker & Saldaitis, 2016 Sokotra
Eublemma megistodea Hacker, 2019 Kenya
Eublemma melabasis (Hampson, 1914) northern Nigeria, Ethiopia, Kenya, South Africa
Eublemma melabela Hampson, 1910 Pakistan
Eublemma melanodonta Hampson, 1910 South Africa, Namibia, Botswana
Eublemma melanoplera Hacker, 2019 Zaire, Uganda, Tanzania
Eublemma melasema Hampson, 1918
Eublemma mesodonta Hacker & Stadie, 2019 Oman
Eublemma mesophaea Hampson, 1910 Cape Verde?, Arabia, Ethiopia, Malawi, Tanzania, Namibia, Zimbabwe, South Africa, Madagascar
Eublemma mesozona Hampson, 1914 Ghana, Eritrea
Eublemma metachrostica Hacker, 2019 South Africa
Eublemma miasma Hampson, 1891
Eublemma microcroca Hacker, 2019 Mauritania, Togo, Burkina Faso, Nigeria, Gabon
Eublemma microphysa Hacker, 2019 Namibia
Eublemma microptera (Brandt, 1939) Iran
Eublemma microtephra Hacker, 2019 Cameroon
Eublemma minima (Guenée, 1852) southern US - Argentina, Antilles – everlasting bud moth
Eublemma miniparva Fibiger & Hacker, 2002 Yemen, Ethiopa, Tanzania
Eublemma minutata (Fabricius, 1794) western Europe, central Europe, Turkey, north-western Iran, Arabia Harmokääpiöyökkönen Scarce Marbled Zwergeulchen
Eublemma minutoides Poole, 1989 Kenya, Tanzania
Eublemma minutulalis Hacker, 2016 Yemen
Eublemma misturata Hampson, 1910
Eublemma mkalama Hacker, 2019 Tanzania
Eublemma monotona Le Cerf, 1911
Eublemma morosa Wiltshire, 1970
Eublemma munda (Christoph, 1884)
Eublemma murati (Brandt, 1939) Iran
Eublemma muscatensis Wiltshire, 1980 Arabia
Eublemma nelvai Rothschild, 1920 Algeria
Eublemma nigribasis Bethune-Baker, 1911
Eublemma nigrifascia Hacker, 2019 Somalia
Eublemma nigrivitta Hampson, 1902 Namibia, South Africa, Zimbabwe, Botswana, Malawi, Somalia
Eublemma nives (Brandt, 1938) Iran
Eublemma niviceps Hacker & Saldaitis, 2019 Sokotra
Eublemma noctuelioides (Wiltshire, 1971) Afghanistan
Eublemma notochroma Hacker, 2019 Namibia
Eublemma notoleuca Hacker, 2019 Namibia, South Africa
Eublemma notoparva Hacker, 2019 Namibia
Eublemma nuristana (Wiltshire, 1961) Afghanistan
Eublemma nyctichroa Hampson, 1910 Kenya, Ethiopia
Eublemma nyctopa Bethune-Baker, 1911 Angola
Eublemma obscura (Krüger, 1939) Libya
Eublemma ochrata Hacker, 2019 Senegal, Burkina Faso, Nigeria, Ethiopia, Malawi, Tanzania
Eublemma ochreola (Staudinger, 1900) Greece, Macedonia, Turkey, Lebanon, north-western Iran
Eublemma ochricosta Hampson, 1916 Arabia, Sudan, Somalia, Tanzania
Eublemma ochrobasis Hampson, 1910 South Africa
Eublemma ochrochroa Hampson, 1910 Sierra Leone
Eublemma ochropolia Hacker, 2019 South Africa
Eublemma odontophora Hampson, 1910 Saudi Arabia
Eublemma oliva Fibiger & Hacker, 2002 Yemen
Eublemma olmii Berio, 1937
Eublemma ornatula (Felder & Rogenhofer, 1874) Kenya, Uganda, Tanzania, Zimbabwe, South Africa
Eublemma orthogramma (Snellen, 1872) Sierra Leone, Togo, Ivory Coast, Burkina Faso, Nigeria, Cameroon, Gabon, Zaire, Tanzania, Madagascar
Eublemma ostrina (Hübner, [1808]) Mauritania, northern Africa, southern Europe, Middle East, Turkey, Caucasus, Transcaucasia, Arabia, Ethiopia, Sudan, Niger – purple marbled moth
Eublemma pallidula (Herrich-Schäffer, 1856) Turkey, Armenia, Cyprus, Ukraine, Lebanon, Israel, Jordan, Iran, Iraq, Arabia, Kyrgyzstan, Turkmenistan, Uzbekistan
Eublemma pallidulalis Hacker, 2019 South Africa, Namibia
Eublemma pannonica Freyer, 1840
Eublemma panonica (Freyer, 1840) southern Urals
Eublemma parallela (Freyer, 1842) southern Urals, Turkey, Caucasus, Transcaucasia, north-western Iran
Eublemma parva (Hübner, [1808]) Mauritania, northern Africa, southern Europe, central Europe, Middle East, Turkey, Caucasus, Transcaucasia, Iraq, Iran, Afghanistan, Pakistan, Arabia, Sudan, Niger, north-western India, Australia – small marbled moth
Eublemma parvisi Berio, 1940
Eublemma parvoides (Brandt, 1939) Iran, Oman
Eublemma pendula de Joannis, 1928 Vietnam
Eublemma penicillata Hampson, 1902 South Africa, Eswatini, Zimbabwe, Tanzania
Eublemma pennula (Felder & Rogenhofer, 1874) Yemen, Ethiopia, Kenya, Tanzania, Zimbabwe, South Africa, Madagascar
Eublemma perkeo Rothschild, 1921 Burkina Fasoe, Niger, Ethiopia, Kenya, Tanzania, Namibia
Eublemma permixta (Staudinger, 1897) Algeria
Eublemma pernivea Rothschild, 1920
Eublemma perobliqua Hampson, 1910 Kenya, Tanzania
Eublemma perturbata Hacker, 2019 Cameroon, Yemen, Ethiopia, Kenya, Tanzania, Comoros
Eublemma phaeapera Hampson, 1910
Eublemma phaeotephra Hacker, 2019 Nigeria
Eublemma plagiochroma Hacker, 2016 Yemen, Sudan, Kenya, Tanzania, Zimbabwe, Mauritania, Ghana
Eublemma plagirosea Holloway, 2009 Bornoeo, Peninsular Malaysia
Eublemma plectroversa Hacker, 2019 Ethiopia, Kenya
Eublemma plumbosa Distant, 1899
Eublemma poliochila Hacker, 2019 South Africa
Eublemma poliochra Hacker, 2019 Ethiopia, Kenya, Tanzania, Zimbabwe, South Africa, Angola, Gabon, Liberia, Sierra Leone, Madagascar
Eublemma politzari Hacker, 2019 Burkina Faso
Eublemma polygramma (Duponchel, [1842]) northern Africa, southern Europe, Turkey, Cyprus, Caucasus, Transcaucasia, Middle East, Iran
Eublemma popovi (Wiltshire, 1953) Persia
Eublemma porphyrescens Hampson, 1914
Eublemma porphyrina (Freyer, 1845) south-western Siberia
Eublemma postrosea Gaede, 1935
Eublemma postrufa Hampson, 1914
Eublemma postrufoides Poole, 1989
Eublemma posttornalis Rothschild, 1915
Eublemma prolai (Berio, 1977) Tanzania
Eublemma proleuca Hampson, 1910 Ghana, southern Nigeria, Gabon, Uganda, Tanzania
Eublemma psamathea Hampson, 1910 Ethiopia, Kenya, Tanzania, Angola
Eublemma pseudepistrota (Brandt, 1938) Iran
Eublemma pseudonoctua Rothschild, 1921 Nigeria
Eublemma pseudostrina Rothschild, 1914
Eublemma pseudoviridis (Brandt, 1939) Iran
Eublemma pudica (Snellen, 1880) Indo-Australian tropics - Queensland, Samoa
Eublemma pudorina (Staudinger, 1889) Greece, Bulgaria, Romania, Ukraine, Turkey
Eublemma pulcherrima Wiltshire, 1982 Arabia, Ethiopia, Uganda
Eublemma pulchra (Swinhoe, 1886) India (Madhya Pradesh)
Eublemma pulverulenta (Warren & Rothschild, 1905) Sudan
Eublemma punctilinea Hampson, 1902 South Africa
Eublemma pura (Hübner, [1813]) northern Africa, south-western Europe
Eublemma purinula Turati, 1934
Eublemma purpurina (Denis & Schiffermüller, 1775) northern Africa, central Europe, southern Europe, Turkey, Caucasus, south-western Siberia 
Eublemma purulenta Turati, 1934
Eublemma pusilla (Eversmann, 1837) southern Urals, Turkey, Caucasus, Transcaucasia
Eublemma pyrastis Hampson, 1910 South Africa
Eublemma pyrochroa Hampson, 1918 Gambia, Senegal, Ghana, Ivory Coast, Burkina Faso, Nigeria, Chad, Malawi
Eublemma pyrosticta de Joannis, 1910
Eublemma quadrilineata (Moore, 1881) India (West Bengal), Pakistan, Eritrea, Malawi
Eublemma quinarioides Berio, 1947
Eublemma ragusana Freyer, 1845
Eublemma ragusanoides Berio, 1954
Eublemma recta Guenée, 1852 – straight-lined seed moth
Eublemma reducta Butler, 1894
Eublemma reninigra Berio, 1945
Eublemma respersa Hübner, 1790
Eublemma reussi Gaede, 1935
Eublemma rhodocraspis Druce, 1909 Borneo
Eublemma rietzi Fibiger, Ronkay, Zilli & Yela, 2010 Spain
Eublemma rivula (Moore, 1882) India (West Bengal), Australia, Kenya, Malawi, Botswana, South Africa, Seychelles
Eublemma robertsi (Berio, 1969) Mauritania, Nigeria, Togo, Zaire, Arabia, Djibouti, Somalia, Ethiopia, Kenya, Tanzania, north-western India
Eublemma ronkayorum Fibiger & Hacker, 2002 Turkmenistan
Eublemma rosea (Hübner, 1790) southern Europe, Turkey, Transcaucasia, Caucasus, southern Urals - Transbaikalia
Eublemma roseana (Moore, 1881) India, Borneo, New Quinea, Queensland, Bismarcks, Oman
Eublemma rosearcuata Holloway, 2009 Borneo, Peninsular Malaysia
Eublemma rosecincta Hampson, 1910
Eublemma roseonivea (Walker, [1863]) Borneo, Peninsular Malaysia
Eublemma roseoniveoides Holloway, 2009 Borneo
Eublemma rosibrunnea Holloway, 2009 Borneo, Peninsular Malaysia
Eublemma rosina Hübner, [1803]
Eublemma rosinans Lucas, 1938 Morocco
Eublemma rubricilia Hampson, 1902 Sikkim, Bhutan, Singapore
Eublemma rubripuncta Hampson, 1902
Eublemma rufimixta Hampson, 1918
Eublemma rufipuncta Turner, 1902 Australia (Queensland)
Eublemma rufocastanea Rothschild, 1924 Madagascar
Eublemma rufoglactea Holloway, 1979
Eublemma rufolineata Hampson, 1918 Louisiade Islands
Eublemma rufoscastanea Rothschild, 1924
Eublemma rushi Wiltshire, 1961
Eublemma sabia (Felder & Rogenhofer, 1874) South Africa
Eublemma salangi (Wilthire, 1961) Afghanistan (Hindu-Kush)
Eublemma sarcosia Hampson, 1910 India (Madras)
Eublemma savour Berio, 1950 Burkina Faso, Nigeria, Yemen, Sudan, Eritrea, Ethiopia, Kenya, Tanzania, Namibia, Zimbabwe, Madagascar
Eublemma sciaphora Hampson, 1910
Eublemma scitula (Rambur, 1833) southern Europe, tropical Africa, tropical Asia, Pakistan, New Guinea, Australia (introduced)
Eublemma scituloides Rebel, 1917 Sudan, Togo
Eublemma scitulum (Rambur, 1833)
Eublemma scotina D. S. Fletcher, 1963 Uganda
Eublemma scotopis Bethune-Baker, 1911 Mauritania, Senegal, Togo, Ivory Coast, Burkina Faso, Nigeria
Eublemma seminivea Hampson, 1896 Arabia, Niger, Sudan, Ethiopia, Kenya, Tanzania, South Africa
Eublemma semiochrea Krüger, 1939
Eublemma sidanomia Hacker, Fiebig & Stadie, 2019 Ethiopia
Eublemma siticulina Hacker, 2019 Ethiopia
Eublemma siticulosa (Lederer, 1858) Syria, Israel, Iran, Iraq, Arabia
Eublemma skoui Fibiger & Hacker, 2004 Yemen
Eublemma sororcula Hacker, 2019 Tanzania
Eublemma sperans Felder & Rogenhofer, 1874
Eublemma spirogramma Rebel, 1912 Mauritania, Togo, Burkina Faso, Nigeria, Sudan, Egypt, Ethiopia, Kenya, South Africa
Eublemma squalida (Staudinger, 1878) northern Iran, Algeria
Eublemma squamilinea (Felder & Rogenhofer 1874)
Eublemma staudingeri (Wallengren, 1875) South Africa, Zimbabwe, Yemen, Eritrea, Nigeria
Eublemma stenodea Hacker, 2019 Namibia
Eublemma stictilinea Hampson, 1910
Eublemma straminea (Staudinger, [1892]) Greece, Turkey, Lebanon, Israel, Iraq, Iran, Arabia, Sinai
Eublemma striantula (Wiltshire, 1961) Afghanistan
Eublemma stygiochroa Hampson, 1910
Eublemma subflavipes Hacker & Saldaitis, 2010 Yemen
Eublemma subrufula Rothschild, 1924 Madagascar
Eublemma subvenata (Staudinger, 1892) Tunisia, Algeria, Israel, Jordan, Arabia
Eublemma suppuncta (Staudinger, [1892]) Turkey
Eublemma suppura (Staudinger, [1892]) Turkey, Lebanon
Eublemma sydolia Schaus, 1940 Puerto Rico
Eublemma symphona Prout, 1928
Eublemma syrtensis Hampson, 1910 Algeria
Eublemma tachycornis (Strand, 1920) Taiwan
Eublemma taftana (Brandt, 1941) Iran
Eublemma taifensis Wiltshire, 1980 Arabia
Eublemma tephroclytioides Rothschild, 1924
Eublemma terminimaculata Wileman, 1915 Taiwan
Eublemma therma Hampson, 1910 Kenya, Namibia, South Africa
Eublemma thermobasis Hampson, 1910 Jordan, Morocco
Eublemma thermochroa Hampson, 1910 South Africa, Namibia
Eublemma thermosticta Hampson, 1910
Eublemma thurneri Zerny, 1935
Eublemma titanica Hampson, 1910
Eublemma tomentalis Rebel, 1947 Israel, Arabia, Egypt
Eublemma topi Fibiger & Hacker, 2006 Yemen, Ethiopia, Tanzania
Eublemma trifasciata (Moore, 1881) India, Borneo
Eublemma trigramma Hampson, 1910 Togo, Burkina Fase, Nigeria, Ethiopia, Tanzania, Zambia, Zimbabwe, Angola
Eublemma tritonia (Hampson, 1902) Ethiopia, Somalia, Malawi, Zaire, Uganda, Tanzania, Zimbabwe, South Africa
Eublemma trollei Fibigier & Hacker, 2006 Yemen
Eublemma truncatalis (Walker, 1863) Borneo
Eublemma trusmadi Holloway, 2009 Borneo, Peninsular Malaysia
Eublemma tytrocoides Hacker & Hausmann, 2010 Mauritania, Togo, Burkina Faso
Eublemma udzungwa Hacker, 2019 Tanzania
Eublemma uhlenhuthi Wiltshire, 1988 Djibouti, Ethiopia, Kenya, Tanzania
Eublemma uhlenhuthiana Hacker, 2019 Ethiopia
Eublemma uniformis (Staudinger, 1878) northern Iran
Eublemma uninotata Hampson, 1902 South Africa
Eublemma usambara Hacker, 2019 Tanzania
Eublemma variochrea Holloway, 1979 New Caledonia
Eublemma velocissima Turati, 1926
Eublemma vestalis (Butler, 1886) Australia
Eublemma viettei (Berio, 1954) Sierra Leone, Ghana, Nigeria, Congo, Ethiopia, Kenya, Uganda, Malawi, Tanzania, Mozambique, Zimbabwe, South Africa, Madagascar, Mauritius
Eublemma virginalis (Oberthür, 1881) Algeria
Eublemma viridis (Staudinger, 1888)
Eublemma viridula (Guenée, 1841) southern Europe
Eublemma wagneri (Herrich-Schäffer, [1851]) Turkey
Eublemma willotti Holloway, 2009 Borneo
Eublemma wiltshirei Fibiger & Hacker, 2002 Iran, Yemen
Eublemma wolframmeyi Hacker, 2019 Namibia
Eublemma wollastoni Rothschild, 1901 Egypt, Sudan
Eublemma wutzdorffi (Püngeler, 1907) Jordan, Palestine, Egypt, Arabia, Tanzania
Eublemma xanthochroa Hacker, 2019 South Africa
Eublemma xanthocraspis Hampson, 1910
Eublemma zillii Fibiger, Ronkay & Yela, 2010 Crete

References

 
 Hampson (1910). Catalogue of the Lepidoptera Phalaenae in the British Museum 10: 94, Pl. 151: 6.

External links
 
 

Boletobiinae
Noctuoidea genera
Insect pests of millets